Signs of the Time is a 2005 album by Mob Rules.

Signs of the Time may also refer to:

Signs of the Time (film), a documentary on the origin of hand signals in baseball
Signs of the Time, a 2008 album by With Increase 
"Signs of the Time", track on 1987 Just as I Am (Yolanda Adams album)

See also
Sign of the Times (disambiguation)